The Incredible Machine is a puzzle video game released in 1993, and the first release in The Incredible Machine video game series. The objective of the game is to create Rube Goldberg machines by arranging collections of objects in a complex fashion, so as to perform some simple task (such as "put the ball into a box" or "start a mixer and turn on a fan"). The Even More Incredible Machine was an extended version of the original, also released in 1993; it had 160 levels, about twice the number of levels in the original game, and had more parts to use in the contraptions.

Development
The Incredible Machine, the first game in the series, was originally going to be developed by Electronic Arts for the Commodore 64 in 1984, but Dynamix worked on Arcticfox for the Amiga instead and work did not start on The Incredible Machine until the spring of 1992. Kevin Ryan programmed The Incredible Machine in nine months, on a $36,000 budget.

Reception
Computer Gaming World in 1993 praised The Incredible Machine, stating that while the 80 puzzles "are a blast" the Free Form Mode was the game's best feature; "the curious, tinkering 10-year-old is re-awakened, given a digital toy box and set loose in the backyard of his or her mind". The magazine concluded that the game was "one of the most innovative and deceptively addicting products to pass this way in quite a while ... a well-oiled imagination machine with a very broad appeal". In 1993, Dragon gave the game 4 out of 5 stars. Electronic Gaming Monthly gave the 3DO version a 7.25 out of 10, saying that its controls are too slow due to the lack of mouse support, but that it is nonetheless better than the PC version due to the dramatically improved graphics and sound.

In 1996, Computer Gaming World named The Incredible Machine the 62nd best game ever. The editors summarized it as "fresh in concept and long on gameplay".

The Even More Incredible Machine
Scott A. May for Compute! said "The Even More Incredible Machine is divine madness – a delightfully addicting, thoroughly intelligent arcade game that should not be missed".

PC Zone said "The Even More Incredible Machine is addictive and testing. Furthermore, it is flexible enough to last. The real puzzle, however, is reserved for the retailers, who must how out how to stack the weird-shaped box on their shelves".

T. Liam McDonald for Game Players PC Entertainment said "if you're a puzzle fan who hasn't picked up the original, you'll definitely want to explore the zany world of The Even More Incredible Machine".

Stephen Kent for CD-ROM Today said: "This game will not return you to the awe-struck discovery years of your childhood, but it's a fun-filled return to the machines that usually only function in a child’s mind".

Computer Gaming World Ed Dille in 1993 stated that "The Even More Incredible Machine lives up to its billing, surpassing the original in terms of play value, if not presentation".

Awards
The Incredible Machine was nominated for an award at the 1993 Game Developers Conference, and was the winner of several prizes due to its innovative style and simulation abilities. It was innovative enough that Sid & Al's Incredible Toons earned Jeff Tunnell and Chris Cole a patent for the game concepts.

The Incredible Machine for iPad/iPhone also won Best iPhone/iPad Game and was nominated for Best Puzzle Game at E3 by IGN.

References

External links

1993 video games
3DO Interactive Multiplayer games
Cancelled Xbox 360 games
Classic Mac OS games
DOS games
Dynamix games
Educational video games
FM Towns games
Games commercially released with DOSBox
NEC PC-9801 games
Puzzle video games
Sierra Entertainment games
Single-player video games
Video games developed in the United States
Video games scored by Christopher Stevens
Video games with expansion packs
Windows games